Marsha Stephanie Blake (born  May 1974) is an American actress. She is best known for her role as Linda McCray in the Netflix miniseries When They See Us, for which she was nominated for the Primetime Emmy Award for Outstanding Supporting Actress in a Limited Series or Movie.

Life and career
Blake was born in Jamaica and emigrated to the United States in the late 1980s with her family. She attended Dartmouth College and graduated in 1996. She received an MFA from the graduate acting program at UCSD.

Blake has played many roles on Broadway and Off-Broadway productions, including The Merchant of Venice, Come and Gone, The Crucible, An Octoroon, and Hurt Village. On television, she guest-starred in Law & Order, Law & Order: Special Victims Unit, Third Watch, Elementary, and The Good Wife.

In 2015, Blake joined the cast of the Netflix comedy-drama series Orange Is the New Black playing Berdie Rogers. Along with the cast, she received the Screen Actors Guild Award for Outstanding Performance by an Ensemble in a Comedy Series. She also had recurring roles on Happyish, Getting On and The Blacklist. In 2019, Blake played Linda McCray in the Netflix miniseries When They See Us directed by Ava DuVernay. Later in 2019, Blake was cast as Vivian Maddox in How to Get Away with Murder for the sixth and final season, and in fourth season of This Is Us opposite her When They See Us co-star, Asante Blackk.

Blake also has appeared in a number of movies, including The Architect (2006), Stand Clear of the Closing Doors (2013), Nasty Baby (2015), Person to Person (2017), Crown Heights (2017), The Wilde Wedding (2017), Luce (2019), See You Yesterday (2019), The Laundromat (2019), and I'm Your Woman (2020).

She received a Canadian Screen Award nomination for Best Supporting Performance in a Film at the 11th Canadian Screen Awards in 2023, for her performance as Ruth in the film Brother.

Filmography

Film

Television

References

External links
 

21st-century American actresses
African-American actresses
American film actresses
American stage actresses
American television actresses
Living people
Year of birth missing (living people)
Jamaican emigrants to the United States
21st-century African-American women
21st-century African-American people